Kevin Charles Briscoe (20 August 1936 – 1 April 2009) was a New Zealand rugby union player. A halfback, Briscoe represented  at a provincial level, and was a member of the New Zealand national side, the All Blacks, from 1959 to 1964. He played 43 matches for the All Blacks—three of which were as captain—including nine internationals.

References

1936 births
2009 deaths
Rugby union players from New Plymouth
People educated at New Plymouth Boys' High School
New Zealand rugby union players
New Zealand international rugby union players
Taranaki rugby union players
Rugby union scrum-halves